An Amphiptere (also called Amphithere, Amphitere, or Phipthere; meaning bi-winged, two-winged) is a type of winged serpent found in European heraldry.

Appearance 

Amphipteres generally were said to have light-colored feathers like a sunrise, a serpentine body similar to a lindworm, bat-like wings with feathers covering most of the forearm and often greenish in coloration, and a long tail much like a wyvern's. Others are described as entirely covered in feathers with a spiked tail, bird-like wings, and a beak-like snout. Even more uncommon is the description of one with legs.

Usage 
Amphipteres saw infrequent use as heraldic devices. Amphipteres are present on the arms of the House of Potier, which depict a bendlet purpure between two amphipteres. The Potier heraldry also uses amphipteres as supporters, as do those of the Duke of Tresmes and Duke of Gesvres.

Modern fiction 
Amphitheres feature in the Dragonology series of books, which employ a conceit that dragons are real. It also appears in Dracopedia: A Guide to Drawing the Dragons of the World.

In the 2021 film Godzilla vs. Kong, Kong fought against Amphiptere-type creatures called Warbats in the Hollow Earth.

Amphitheres also appear in other modern fictional works.

See also 
 Feathered Serpent
 Lindworm
 Wyvern
 Jaculus
 Winged serpent
 Flying serpent (disambiguation)

References 

Dragons
Legendary serpents
Heraldic beasts